D.C. Cab (also known as Street Fleet) is a 1983 American comedy film written and directed by Joel Schumacher, based on a story by Topper Carew and Schumacher, and starring Max Gail, Adam Baldwin, Mr. T, Charlie Barnett, Gary Busey, Marsha Warfield, and Whitman Mayo.

Plot
Naive but good natured young man Albert Hockenberry (Baldwin) arrives in Washington, D.C., with plans to work for his late father's army buddy Harold (Gail), owner of the run-down District of Columbia Cab company. Aware of the sorry state of his business and from the growing competition from the popular Emerald Cab Company, Harold wants to clean it up but doesn't have the financial means to do so. Complicating matters is the motley group of cab drivers that he has working for him. They all see driving as a dead-end job while they wait for better lives, until Albert inspires them to work as a team.

A valuable violin is found in one of the cabs, earning Harold and his wife a $10,000 reward as owners of the cab. Harold wants to share the money with the drivers and let them invest in the cab company as partners. However, his greedy wife Myrna picks up the reward money and tosses Harold and Albert's belongings out of the house. The cabbies are not happy about losing their share of the reward, so Albert decides to donate $6,063 of his own money to the cab company and convinces the drivers to stay and make something of the company and themselves. The cabbies completely overhaul the entire business, and the revitalized company soon supplants Emerald Cab as the most popular in the city.

Later on, the cabbies work together to rescue Albert and a diplomat's two children after they're kidnapped. The film ends with a parade in D.C. Cab's honor.

Cast

 Max Gail as Harold Oswelt
 Adam Baldwin as Albert Hockenberry
 Mr. T as Samson
 Charlie Barnett as Tyrone Bywater
 Gary Busey as Dell
 Gloria Gifford as Miss Floyd
 Marsha Warfield as Ophelia
 Bill Maher as Baba
 DeWayne Jessie as Bongo
 Paul Rodriguez as Xavier
 Whitman Mayo as Mr. Rhythm
 Peter Barbarian as Buddy
 David Barbarian as Buzzy
 Irene Cara as Herself
 Diana Bellamy as Maudie
 John Diehl as Head Kidnapper
 Newton D. Arnold as FBI Chief
 Dennis Stewart as Ski Mask Hoodlum
 Jim Moody as Arnie
 Bob Zmuda as Cubby 
 Anne DeSalvo as Myrna
 José Pérez as Ernesto Bravo
 Jill Schoelen as Claudette
 Timothy Carey as Angel of Death

Reception
D.C. Cab grossed $16,134,627 in theatres.

Critical response
D.C. Cab received negative reviews from film critics. Roger Ebert gave the film two out of four stars saying, D.C. Cab' is not an entirely bad movie, [but] feels like a movie with a split personality." The kidnapping plot was praised for being "fresh," while the stolen violin plot was described as "paralyzingly boring." Overall, he described it as "mindless, likable confusion." Critic Edward Sargent of The Washington Post writes in his review: "Despite its shortcomings, D.C. Cab is an hour and 40 minutes' worth of finger-popping music and gags. But viewers should remember that this low-budget film features large doses of vulgarity meant to illicit several cheap laughs."

Critic Janet Maslin of The New York Times wrote in her review: "D.C. CAB is a musical mob scene, a raucous, crowded movie that's fun as long as it stays wildly busy, and a lot less interesting when it wastes time on plot or conversation. There's a lot of talent in the large cast, and Joel Schumacher, the director, generally keeps things bustling. Mr. Schumacher was once a costume designer, which helps explain why everything here is so wildly colorful, as the characters joke around in outfits that are traffic-stopping. The movie has just the sort of bouncy, frantic, dopey humor to please the young fans of Mr. T., who is one of its stars. However, the film makers have thrown in enough R-rated material to make D.C. Cab slightly out of reach for very young audiences."

Ian Buckwalter of the Washington City Paper wrote in his review: "I'm not going to argue that D.C. Cab is a great movie, or even a good one. It wasn't a hit when it was released in December 1983, and it would probably be a stretch to even call it a cult favorite, since whatever cult exists around it is probably limited to Mr. T completists and a cadre of local film obsessives. [...] Still, by any rational measure, D.C. Cab is pretty terrible. The plot is standard '80s underdogs-strike-back fare, with the titular cab company, a gang of misfits and outcasts trying to avoid being shut down by a corrupt, power-hungry hack inspector who's in the pocket of the smug, satin jacket-wearing drivers of the Emerald Cab Company. It's basically Revenge of the Nerds with taxis. The script is ostensibly a comedy, but most of its humor is unintentional."

Soundtrack

Irene Cara performed the main title theme to the film. Gary Busey performed "Why Baby Why". The soundtrack was released in 1983.

Release
D.C. Cab was released in theatres on December 16, 1983. The film was released on DVD on March 1, 2005, by Universal Studios Home Entertainment. D.C. Cab was released on the digital distribution app store Google Play.
A high definition Blu-ray release by Kino Lorber was released on December 1, 2020.

References

Sources

External links
 
 
 
 
 

1983 films
1983 comedy films
American comedy films
Films set in Washington, D.C.
Films shot in Washington, D.C.
Films directed by Joel Schumacher
Films with screenplays by Joel Schumacher
Universal Pictures films
1980s English-language films
Films scored by Giorgio Moroder
RKO Pictures films
Films about taxis
1980s American films